McSorley and MacSorley are surnames in the English language. The names are Anglicised forms of the Gaelic Mac Somhairle.

People with the surname
McSorley
Chris McSorley (born 1962), Canadian ice hockey coach and executive
Cisco McSorley (born 1950), Democratic member of the New Mexico senate
Ernest M. McSorley (1912–1975), last captain of the ill-fated Laker-type freighter SS Edmund Fitzgerald
Fred MacSorley ( 2011), medical doctor from Northern Ireland
Gerard McSorley (born 1950), Irish theatre, television and film actor
Jade McSorley (born 1988), English model
Jean McSorley, English/Australian anti-nuclear campaigner
John McSorley (born 1941), English athlete
Marty McSorley (born 1963), Canadian professional ice-hockey player
Mary McSorley, Irish nationalist politician
Richard McSorley (1914–2002), American Jesuit priest, peace activist and writer
Tom McSorley, Canadian film critic and scholar
Trace McSorley (born 1995), American professional football quarterback
Trick McSorley (1852–1936), American professional baseball player

Places
McSorley Hill, a K30 ski jumping hill located in Red Wing, Minnesota, United States, opened in 1887.

See also
McSorley's Old Ale House
Dubhghall mac Ruaidhrí, (died 1268), Norse-Gaelic monarch, sometimes known as Mac Sorley

References

Anglicised Irish-language surnames
English-language surnames
Patronymic surnames
Surnames from given names